20 Canada Square is an office building located in the Canary Wharf section of London. Currently, 20 Canada Square is home to the London Trading offices (IST) of BP and the UK headquarters of American company S&P Global. 

The building is divided into twelve floors, with S&P Global and BP each occupying 6 floors.

Reference

Skidmore, Owings & Merrill buildings
Canary Wharf buildings
Office buildings in London
Buildings and structures in the London Borough of Tower Hamlets

Office buildings completed in 2003